The 2016 Judo Grand Prix Ulaanbaatar was held at the Buyant Ukhaa Sport Complex in Ulaanbaatar, Mongolia from 1 to 3 July 2016.

Medal summary

Men's events

Women's events

Source Results

Medal table

References

External links
 

2016 IJF World Tour
2016 Judo Grand Prix
IJF World Tour Ulaanbaatar
Judo
Grand Prix 2016
Judo
Judo
Judo